Computer Networks: The Heralds of Resource Sharing is a short documentary film from 1972, produced by Steven King and directed/edited by Peter Chvany, about ARPANET, an early packet switching network and the one of the first networks to implement the protocol suite TCP/IP.

Content
The 30 minute film features many of the most important names in computer networking, especially J. C. R. Licklider and others from MIT's Project MAC who had connected a computer to ARPANET the year before. According to a history of computing equipment by Columbia University it "begins with a montage of equipment ... and then has interviews with ARPANET creators." The film discusses "the potential that this network has for revolutionizing so many industries and institutions".

Participants

Speaking parts:
 Fernando J. Corbato (Corby): (voice 0:45-1:15, face 1:00-1:15, 15:10-15:40) 
Turing Award winner, implementer of multitasking operating systems.
 J. C. R. Licklider (Lick): (1:00-1:40), and many times throughout the film. Licklider discusses how, despite the invention of the printing press being a revolution, the transmission of information on paper was slow. He also discusses collaboration, access to digital libraries, the transition to electronic information and the social processes involved in this.
 Lawrence G. Roberts: (voice 1:40-2:25) SIGCOMM Award winner.
 Robert Kahn: (2:25-2:35, 3:15-6:25, 6:55-) Turing Award winner.
 Frank Heart: (2:35-3:15, 6:25-6:55)
 William R. Sutherland (Bert): (13:50-15:10)
 Richard W. Watson: (17:34-18:30, 25:05-25:15) mass storage researcher
 John R. Pasta: (18:30-19:25)
 Donald W. Davies: (19:25-21:55)
 George W. Mitchell: (21:55-24:05, voice only)

Non-speaking:
 Daniel L. Murphy: (Behind the titles, several other times including about 15:44)

Unidentified:
 (8:27-8:32, with beard and glasses): previously misidentified as Jon Postel

Reception
Cory Doctorow called the documentary a "fantastic 30 minutes of paleo-nerd memorabilia". Matt Novak of Gizmodo said "When you hear a man like J.C.R. Licklider describe the information age before it had even begun to trickle into the public consciousness, we understand how forward-thinking these people developing the ARPANET in the late 1960s and early 1970s truly were." Mark Liberman described it as "amazing".

See also 

 History of the Internet
 List of Internet pioneers
 Nerds 2.0.1 – 1998 documentary about the development of the ARPANET, the Internet, and the World Wide Web
 Protocol Wars
 Resource sharing

References

External links
  - full film
 Transcript

1972 documentary films
ARPANET
History of the Internet
Documentary films about the Internet